The green bright-eyed frog (Boophis viridis) is a species of frog in the family Mantellidae. It is endemic to Madagascar.

Description
The hands and feet are webbed. Their dorsal skin is smooth and green in color, sometimes with reddish spots, as well. They also have the ability to change colors and become more reddish brown. Their inner and outer irises are blue.

Reproduction
Males call at night while in vegetation about 1–2 metres above the ground, along streams, and also by ditches. When the weather is dry, a calling green bright-eyed frog has also been found up as high as 5 m. The calls are a combination of two inharmonious note types that include a long note repeated in short pulses and a shorter note consisting of three repeated notes.

Breeding takes place in streams. One pair of frogs can have as many as 154 dark-brown eggs.

Population
The species is not currently threatened. The reasons for possible decrease in population include:
General habitat alteration and loss
Habitat modification from deforestation, or logging-related activities
Intensified agriculture or grazing
Urbanization
Habitat fragmentation

References

External links
 
 

Boophis
Endemic frogs of Madagascar
Amphibians described in 1979
Taxonomy articles created by Polbot